Dr. Oluwatamilore Falomo (4 April 1942 – 9 November 2019) was a Nigerian physician. He was the Chief Medical Director of Maryland Specialist Hospital and a former Chairman of Lagos State University Teaching Hospital's management board. He was popularly known as the personal physician to Moshood Abiola having been his physician before and during his arrest by Ibrahim Babangida following the controversial 1993 Nigerian presidential election.

Background and education 
Falomo was born in Minna, Niger State. He attended elementary school at Baptist Primary School between 1948 and 1955. He attended Methodist Boys High School where he was schooled from 1956 to 1960. He continued his education at St. Andrews College, Dublin, between 1961 and 1962 before going on to study at the Royal College of Surgeons in Ireland from 1962 to 1968.

Medical career 
He started clinical practice at Park Hospital, Davyhulme in Manchester from 1969 to 1970. He also worked in the Lagos State Department of Health in Surulere from 1971 to 1972, before serving in Ikeja Government Hospital from 1972 to 1973. He became director of the Onikoyi Clinic Hospital in Yaba from 1974 to 1979. He returned to the Royal College of Surgeons in Dublin in 1978.

Personal life 
He married Folashade Soorunke in 1968.

References 

1942 births
2019 deaths
Medical doctors from Niger State
Alumni of the Royal College of Surgeons in Ireland
20th-century Nigerian medical doctors